A conceptual space is a geometric structure that represents a number of quality dimensions, which denote basic features by which concepts and objects can be compared, such as weight, color, taste, temperature, pitch, and the three ordinary spatial dimensions. In a conceptual space, points denote objects, and regions denote concepts. The theory of conceptual spaces is a theory about concept learning first proposed by Peter Gärdenfors. It is motivated by notions such as conceptual similarity and prototype theory.

The theory also puts forward the notion that natural categories are convex regions in conceptual spaces. The notion of concept convexity allows the interpretation of the focal points of regions as category prototypes. In the more general formulations of the theory, concepts are defined in terms conceptual similarity to their prototypes. Conceptual spaces have found applications in both cognitive modelling and artificial intelligence.

See also
Categorical perception
Cognitive architecture
Color space
Commonsense reasoning
Conceptual dependency theory
Distributional semantics
Face space
Formal concept analysis
Frame semantics
Global workspace theory
Image schema
Phonetic space
Semantic space
Similarity (philosophy)
State space
Vector space model
Visual space

Notes 

Cognition
Semantic relations